This is a list of the Deccani film industry's movies filmed in Hyderabadi Urdu and based on Hyderabadi culture. The movie does not need to be produced in Hyderabad. Films produced about Hyderabad should include words that are typically spoken by Hyderabadi working-class people.

References

Hyderabadi
Culture of Hyderabad, India
Urdu in India
Lists of Indian films
Indian films by language
Cinema of Telangana